Jan Rudolf Steinhauser (20 September 1944 – 28 November 2022) was a Dutch rower. He competed at the 1968 Summer Olympics in the eight event and finished in eighth place.

Steinhauser died in Amsterdam on 28 November 2022, at the age of 78.

References

1944 births
2022 deaths
Dutch male rowers
Olympic rowers of the Netherlands
Rowers at the 1968 Summer Olympics
Sportspeople from Nijmegen